Rue de la Bûcherie is a street in the 5th arrondissement of Paris, France.

History 
Near the cathedral Notre-Dame de Paris and the Place Maubert, between La Seine and Boulevard Saint-Germain Rue de la Bûcherie is one of the oldest Rive Gauche streets. 
In the Middle Ages damaged meats were salted and boiled here to feed the poorest.

In the 17th century, La Voisin, a chief personage in the famous affaire des poisons, which disgraced the reign of Louis XIV, lived here.

Nicolas-Edme Rétif, the French novelist, lived on Rue de la Bûcherie during the years leading to his death in 1806.

Until the late 1970s the place was a popular Parisian street with mixed modest restaurants (Lebanese, Asian, Pakistani), antiques dealers, and art galleries.
In the 1970s the Annick Gendron contemporary art gallery was established at no. 1.

The dissection amphitheatre of the ancient Faculty of Medicine where Jacques-Bénigne Winslow taught is still located on Rue de la Bûcherie.

Origin of the name
The name come from the ancient "Port aux bûches", a port where logs were put down.

Buildings of note
 13-15 - amphitheatre of the ancient Faculty of Medicine 
 37 - Shakespeare and Company, a bookstore specializing in English language books while simultaneously employing and boarding English-speaking writers in Paris.

Closest transport
Métro line 10, Maubert-Mutualité, Cluny-la-Sorbonne

Notes and references

External links
 Le Paris pittoresque : Archives of the old Paris